Yassin Cheikh El Welly (Arabic: ياسين شيخ الولي; born 10 October 1998) is a Mauritanian professional footballer who plays as a forward for Tunisian Ligue Professionnelle 1 club Tataouine and the Mauritania national team.

Honours 
Nouadhibou

 Ligue 1 Mauritania: 2017–18, 2018–19, 2019–20
 Mauritanian President's Cup: 2018

References 

1998 births
Living people
Mauritanian footballers
Association football forwards
FC Nouadhibou players
Dhofar Club players
Khaleej Sirte SC players
US Tataouine players
Super D1 players
Oman Professional League players
Tunisian Ligue Professionnelle 1 players
Mauritanian expatriate footballers
Expatriate footballers in Oman
Expatriate footballers in Libya
Expatriate footballers in Tunisia
Mauritanian expatriate sportspeople in Oman
Mauritanian expatriate sportspeople in Libya
Mauritanian expatriate sportspeople in Tunisia
Mauritania A' international footballers
2022 African Nations Championship players